The following is a list of funk rock bands. This list includes bands which have directly played within the funk rock genre, as well as bands which have played within its subgenre, funk metal. It also includes bands described as metal funk, thrash funk or funkcore (synonymous with funk metal), as well as bands described as punk-funk (synonymous with both genres).

Artists

24-7 Spyz
311
3rdeyegirl
Bang Tango
Bloodhound Gang
Bootsauce
Chad Smith's Bombastic Meatbats
Cement
Clutch
Dan Reed Network
Death Angel
Deli Creeps
Electric Boys
Extreme
Faith No More
Fishbone
Follow for Now
Funkadelic
Gang of Four
Guano Apes
 Hot Action Cop
Incubus
Infectious Grooves
INXS
Jane's Addiction
Jimmie's Chicken Shack
Korn
L.A.P.D.
Living Colour
Lucy Brown
Maroon 5
Mind Funk
Mordred
Mother's Finest
Mr. Bungle
Parliament
Pilgrims
Praxis
Primus
Psychefunkapus
Psychostick
Pylon
Rage Against the Machine
Red Hot Chili Peppers
Rollins Band
Royal Crescent Mob
Scatterbrain
Sly and the Family Stone
Snot
Spymob
Sugar Ray
Super Junky Monkey
Supergroove
Talking Heads
The Time
Ugly Kid Joe
Urban Dance Squad
Wild Cherry

See also
Funk rock
Funk metal
List of funk musicians

References

Bibliography

 
Funk rock